Carroll Edwin Metzner (April 24, 1919 – December 6, 2008) was a Wisconsin politician and legislator.

Born in Milwaukee, Wisconsin, Metzner graduated from Northwestern University and received his law degree from the University of Wisconsin–Madison. In 1951, he was elected to the Madison Common Council. Metzner also served in the Wisconsin State Assembly from 1953 to 1957 as a Republican.

Notes

Politicians from Milwaukee
Politicians from Madison, Wisconsin
Northwestern University alumni
University of Wisconsin Law School alumni
Wisconsin city council members
Republican Party members of the Wisconsin State Assembly
1919 births
2008 deaths
20th-century American politicians